"Hisashiburi no Lip Gloss" is 60th single by Japanese idol girl group AKB48. It is released on October 19, 2022. Member Erī Chiba served as both lead singer and choreographic center for the first time.

This single topped Oricon weekly singles chart after its release.

This is the last single released under King Records.

Background and release
The very first official information about this single was announced on July 18, 2022 as the group collaborated with Showroom to select B-side participating members with the result announced on August 3, 2022.

On August 6, 2022 through the group official YouTube stream, A-side participation members known as senbatsu were officially announced as 16 formation members, first time after 4 years since "Sentimental Train" in 2018. Like their previous works, this single were sung by AKB-only members. Member Shinobu Mogi and Airi Satō were selected for the first time. Shinobu was selected for the first time since her debut in December 2011, while Airi who joined the group as trainees was selected after 5 month since her announcement as 17th generation members in May 2022. Airi was the first trainees to be chosen as A-side participated members after Satone Kubo who was selected for 48th single "Negaigoto no Mochigusare" in 2017. This is the last single to feature Tomu Muto, who announced her graduation from the group on October 8th, 2022, at MX Matsuri! AKB48 60th Single "Hisashiburi no Lipgloss" Announcement Commemoration Concert in Budokan 2022 (MX祭り！AKB48 60th Single 「久しぶりのリップグロス」発表記念コンサートin武道館2022) after performing Show Fight! And will graduate from the group in March 2023.

On August 29, 2022 the group made an appearances at TBS's CDTV LIVE! LIVE! performing "Hisashiburi no Lip Gloss" for the first time.

On September 7, 2022 midnight pre-release single was released digitally. The artwork showing a solo silhouette of member Erī Chiba applying a lip gloss, this is her first ever solo artwork cover. A vertical music video that was shot in Okinawa for "Hisashiburi no Lip Gloss" were also released at 8 p.m. JST.

Participating members

"Hisashiburi no Lip Gloss" 
"久しぶりのリップグロス" ("Hisashiburi no Lip Gloss") performed by selection senbatsu performers, consisting of:
Team A: Erī Chiba, Mion Mukaichi, Nana Okada
Team K: Shinobu Mogi, Mizuki Yamauchi
Team B: Yuki Kashiwagi, Maho Omori
Team 4: Yuiri Murayama
Team 8: Hitomi Honda, Erina Oda, Momoka Onishi, Miu Shitao, Narumi Kuranō, Rin Okabe, Yui Oguri
Trainees: Airi Satō

"Sugar Night" 
"Sugar Night" performed by chosen Showroom Senbatsu performers, consisting of:
Team A: Hitomi Otake, Saho Iwatate
Team K: Suzuha Yamane
Team B: Ayana Shinozaki
Team 8: Hitomi Honda, Erina Oda, Momoka Onishi, Yui Oguri

Charts

Weekly charts

Monthly charts

Year-end charts

Certifications

Release history

References 

2022 singles
2022 songs
AKB48 songs
Japanese-language songs
Songs with lyrics by Yasushi Akimoto